Kin's Farm Market is a Canadian-owned chain of retail produce outlets. As of 2019, the company operates 29 stores across British Columbia. The stores sell fresh produce from local farms, as well as imported fruit and vegetables from around the world.

History

Kin's Farm Market was founded in 1983 by Kin Wah and Kin Hun Leung, who were at the time recent graduates of Vancouver Community College at an eight-foot table at the Granville Island market in Vancouver, British Columbia. Four years later, they opened their first retail location at Blundell Centre in Richmond, British Columbia, giving it the name Kin's Farm Market. Three years later, they opened a second store. By 2001, Kin's had opened a total of twelve stores, and by 2012 they had opened close to thirty. 

Kin's Farm Market and its employees organize and participate in a number of community events to promote healthy living and environmental awareness, including the Green Fighter program the Dirty Apron Team, and the BC Blueberry Festival.  The company also contributes to environmental stewardship and medical research.

In 2013, The Georgia Straight magazine named Kin's Farm Market the best produce store in the British Columbia lower mainland area and given a Best of Vancouver Readers' Choice Award.

References 

Supermarkets of Canada
Companies based in Richmond, British Columbia
Food and drink companies based in British Columbia
Retail companies established in 1983
1983 establishments in British Columbia